Yemen participated at the 2017 Summer Universiade in Taipei with only one athlete, who competed in table tennis.

Table tennis

References

Nations at the 2017 Summer Universiade